Korotkovo is a rural locality (a village) in Kubenskoye Rural Settlement, Vologodsky District, Vologda Oblast, Russia. The population was 777 as of 2002.

Geography 
Korotkovo is located 24 km northwest of Vologda (the district's administrative centre) by road. Ileykino is the nearest rural locality.

References 

Rural localities in Vologodsky District